Dimitar Pantaleev (born 19 December 1995) is a Bulgarian footballer who plays as a midfielder for Marek Dupnitsa.

Career
Panteleev began his career in his local Vidima-Rakovski, but after team dissolve he moved to Minyor Pernik. In 2016 he moved to Vitosha Bistritsa. He made his debut in First League on 28 August 2017 in a match against Vereya.

On 8 January 2018 he was sent on loan to Oborishte for the rest of the season.

References

External links
 

1995 births
Living people
Bulgarian footballers
Association football midfielders
PFC Minyor Pernik players
FC Vitosha Bistritsa players
FC Oborishte players
FC Sportist Svoge players
PFC Marek Dupnitsa players
First Professional Football League (Bulgaria) players
Second Professional Football League (Bulgaria) players
People from Sevlievo